Hilaroleopsis nigerrima is a species of beetle in the family Cerambycidae. It was described by Per Olof Christopher Aurivillius in 1923. It is known from Guatemala and Mexico.

References

Hemilophini
Beetles described in 1923